The provincial and territorial courts in Canada are local trial "inferior" or "lower" courts of limited jurisdiction established in each of the provinces and territories of Canada. These courts typically hear criminal, civil (or “small claims”), family, traffic, and bylaw cases. Unlike the superior courts of Canada, the jurisdiction of the provincial courts is limited to those matters which are permitted by statute. They have no inherent jurisdiction. Appeals of provincial court decisions are usually heard by the superior court of the province.

These courts typically evolved from older magistrate, municipal, or local courts. Many of these former courts were as likely to have lay magistrates or justices of the peace presiding as they were to have a judge who had formal legal training.

In the province of Ontario, most municipal and provincial offences are dealt with in the Provincial Offences Court, established under the Ontario Provincial Offences Act and the Courts of Justice Act.

Provincial and territorial courts in Canada 

 Provincial Court of Alberta
 Provincial Court of British Columbia
 Provincial Court of Manitoba
 Provincial Court of New Brunswick
 Provincial Court of Newfoundland and Labrador
 Provincial Court of Nova Scotia
 Territorial Court of the Northwest Territories
 Nunavut Court of Justice
 Ontario Court of Justice
 Provincial Court of Prince Edward Island
 Court of Quebec
 Provincial Court of Saskatchewan
 Territorial Court of Yukon

References

 
Courts in Canada